Death Croons the Blues is a 1937 British crime film directed by David MacDonald and starring Hugh Wakefield, Antoinette Cellier and George Hayes. The film was made at Twickenham Studios by the producer Julius Hagen whose ownership of the company was about to be ended due to financial problems.

Synopsis
A reporter manages to prove a man innocent of murdering a singer.

Cast
 Hugh Wakefield as Jim Martin  
 Antoinette Cellier as Lady Constance Gaye  
 George Hayes as Hugo Branker 
 Hugh Burden as Viscount Brent  
 Gillian Lind
 John Turnbull  
 Barbara Everest

References

Bibliography
Chibnall, Steve. Quota Quickies: The Birth of the British 'B' Film. British Film Institute, 2007.
Low, Rachael. Filmmaking in 1930s Britain. George Allen & Unwin, 1985.
Wood, Linda. British Films, 1927–1939. British Film Institute, 1986.

External links
 

1937 films
1937 crime films
British crime films
Films shot at Twickenham Film Studios
Films directed by David MacDonald (director)
Films based on British novels
British black-and-white films
1930s English-language films
1930s British films